Sociology of Health & Illness (SHI) is a peer-reviewed academic journal which covers the sociological aspects of health, illness, medicine, and health care. It is published by Wiley-Blackwell on behalf of the Foundation for the Sociology of Health and Illness. Established in 1979, the journal was originally published by Routledge and Kegan Paul (up to 2002). The Editorial Team is currently led by Karen Lowton (University of Sussex) and Flis Henwood (University of Brighton) as joint Editors in Chief. Other members of the team are: Dr Catherine Will, Dr Ben Fincham, Dr Catherine Theodosius, Professor Gillian Bendelow and Dr Sasha Scambler.

During the years, the annual number of issues has risen from three to four (1986), five (1993), six (1998) and seven (2003) to eight times a year since 2012. According to the Journal Citation Reports, the journal had an impact factor of 1.735 in 2012, 1.89 in 2016, and currently stands at 2.122 in 2018. The journal was ranked in 2017 as follows: 
ISI Journal Citation Reports @ Ranking: 2017:46/156 (Public, Environmental & Occupational Health (Social Science))
ISI Journal Citation Reports @ Ranking: 2017:10/42 (Social Sciences, Biomedical)
ISI Journal Citation Reports @ Ranking: 2017:29/146 (Sociology)

See also 
 Sociology of health and illness

References

External links 
 
 Foundation for the Sociology of Health & Illness

Wiley-Blackwell academic journals
English-language journals
Publications established in 1979
Sociology journals